The island council is a form of local government in special municipalities in the Caribbean Netherlands. It is similar to municipal council in the European part of the Netherlands. Currently three island councils exist in:

Bonaire
Saba
Sint Eustatius

The island councils were already in existence as island councils of the Netherlands Antilles until their dissolution and became island councils of the Netherlands after that. Elections of the island council coincide with the elections for the States-Provincial and water boards in the European Netherlands, as well as for each island's electoral college for the Senate which consists of representatives with the right to elect the Senate together with the representatives of the States-Provincial.

See also
Municipality of the Netherlands
Electoral colleges for the Senate
Island council (Netherlands Antilles)

References

Caribbean special municipalities of the Netherlands
Government of the Netherlands

nl:Eilandsraad#Eilandsraad in Caribisch Nederland